Fight, Raiders, Fight is the fight song of the Texas Tech Red Raiders. It was written by Vic Williams and John J. Tatgenhorst in Lubbock.

The song was written for the Matadors, the original name of teams representing the school (known at the time as Texas Technological College). In 1936, Texas Tech band members Carroll McMath and James Nevins updated the song to reflect the teams' new name, Red Raiders.

References

Texas Tech University
Texas Tech Red Raiders
American college songs
College fight songs in the United States
Big 12 Conference fight songs
Year of song missing